The Roman Catholic Diocese of Helsinki is a Latin Church diocese of the Catholic Church based in Helsinki, which comprises the whole of Finland.  The diocese is divided into eight parishes.

The bishopric has been vacant since May 2019 when Bishop Teemu Sippo resigned due to poor health. As of 2018 there are 15,000 registered and 10,00 unregistered Catholics living in Finland. There are more than 6,000 Catholic families in the country; 50 percent are Finnish and 50 percent are of international origin.

Parishes

St. Henry's Cathedral, Helsinki (Sub Centres - Tapanila (Vantaa), Porvoo)
St. Mary's Church, Helsinki (Sub Centres - Olari (Espoo), Hyvinkää, Karis)
St. Brigit & Blessed Hemming Church, Turku (Sub Centres - Åland, Eurajoki, Pori)
St. Olav's Church, Jyväskylä
Holy Cross Church, Tampere (Sub Centres - Hämeenlinna, Kokkola, Kristinestad, Jakobstad, Seinäjoki, Vaasa)
St. Ursula's Church, Kouvola (Sub Centres - Hamina, Kotka, Lahti, Lappeenranta)
Holy Family of Nazareth Church, Oulu (Sub Centres - Rovaniemi, Tornio, Kemi, Kajaani)
St. Joseph's Church, Kuopio (Sub Centres - Mikkeli, Savonlinna, Joensuu, Lieksa)

There is a high demand for starting a new parish at Northern Finland at Rovaniemi as it is the major tourist destination for Lapland and Santa Claus.

History
In 1550, the episcopate of the last Roman Catholic bishop of Åbo ended. Thereafter Lutheranism prevailed in Finland. The Reformation in the sixteenth century caused the loss of almost all of Northern Europe from the Roman Catholic Church. In 1582 the stray Catholics in Finland and elsewhere in Northern Europe were placed under the jurisdiction of a papal nuncio in Cologne. The Congregation de propaganda fide, on its establishment in 1622, took charge of the vast missionary field, which - at its third session - it divided among the nuncio of Brussels (for the Catholics in Denmark and Norway), the nuncio at Cologne (much of Northern Germany) and the nuncio to Poland (Finland, Mecklenburg, and Sweden).

In 1688, Finland became part of the Apostolic Vicariate of the Nordic Missions. In 1783, the Apostolic Vicariate of Sweden was created out of parts of the Nordic Missions comprising then Finland and Sweden. In 1809, when Finland came under Russian rule, the Roman Catholic jurisdiction passed on to the Metropolitan Archdiocese of Mohilev (then seated in St. Petersburg). In 1920, the Vatican established the Apostolic Vicariate of Finland which was upgraded to the Diocese of Helsinki in 1955.

Episcopal ordinaries

Apostolic Vicars of Finland 
 Henri Buckx, SCI (1923–1933)
 Willem Cobben, SCI (1933–1955)

Bishops of Helsinki 
 Willem Cobben, SCI (1955–1967)
 Paul Verschuren, SCI (1967–1998)
 Józef Wróbel, SCI (2001–2008)
Teemu Sippo, SCI (2009–2019 )

See also
Catholic Church in Finland
St. Henry's Cathedral
St. Mary's Church, Helsinki

References

External links
Diocese of Helsinki website
GCatholic.org
Catholic Hierarchy

Catholic Church in Finland
Organisations based in Helsinki
Christian organizations established in 1955
1955 establishments in Finland